Dapidodigma is a butterfly genus in the family Lycaenidae. The two species are found in the Afrotropical realm.

Species
Dapidodigma demeter Clench, 1961
Dapidodigma hymen (Fabricius, 1775)

References

Cheritrini
Lycaenidae genera
Taxa named by Ferdinand Karsch